Godai  are the five elements in Japanese Buddhist thought of earth (chi), water (sui), fire (ka), wind (fu), and void (ku). The concept is related to Buddhist Mahābhūta and came over China from India. 

The Japanese Buddhist concept of gogyo, which stems from Chinese wuxing, is distinguishable from godai by the fact that the functional phases of wood and metal within gogyo are replaced by the formative elements of void and the wind (air) in godai. Godai is attributed to esoteric Japanese Buddhism during the eleventh century CE in relation to the idea of gorin (the "five wheels" or the "five rings"). Godai and gorin are also seen within the practice of ninjutsu, where these principles became an essential aspect of the esoteric ninja teachings (the ninpo-mikkyo); whereas the theory of gogyo moved into the functional theory of traditional Japanese medicine and exoteric Buddhism.

The elements
The godai is a static or inert philosophical understanding of the traditional Japanese elements and study, similar to the Greek classical elements. The four main elements or building blocks are Earth, Water, Fire, and Wind, while Void is non substantial.

As such, these may describe an individual's response to direct confrontation, such as in martial arts associations with physical center, footwork.
 Chi: stability/stubbornness; holding ground and using strength and presence (source: strength)
 Sui: flexibility/emotionalism; defensive angling and footwork to overextend the attacker before counterattacking (source: power)
 Ka: aggression/fear; using high energy attacks defensively (source: energy)
 Fu: wisdom/love; evasive, elusive methods that redirect attacks away from their targets (source: resiliency)
 Ku: creative/communicative; spontaneous and inventive fighting

Earth

地 Chi (sometimes ji) or tsuchi, meaning "Earth", represents the hard, solid objects of Earth. The most basic example of chi is in a stone. Stones are highly resistant to movement or change, as is anything heavily influenced by chi. In people, the bones, muscles and tissues are represented by chi. Emotionally, chi is predominantly associated with collectiveness, stability, physicality, and gravity. It is a desire to have things remain as they are; a resistance to change. In the mind, it is confidence when under the influence of this chi mode or "mood", we are aware of our own physicality and sureness of action. This is a separate concept from the energy-force, pronounced in Chinese as qì (also written ch'i) and in Japanese as ki, and written alternatively as 気, 氣, or 气.

Water

水 Sui or mizu, meaning "Water", represents the fluid, flowing, and the formless things in the world. Outside of the obvious example of rivers and the lake, plants are also categorized under sui, as they adapt to their environment, growing and changing according to the direction of the sun and the changing seasons. Blood and other bodily fluids are represented by sui, as are mental or emotional tendencies towards adaptation and change. Sui can be associated with thought, defensiveness, adaptability, flexibility, suppleness, and magnetism.

Fire

火 Ka or hi, meaning "Fire", represents the energetic, forceful, moving things in the world. Animals, capable of movement and full of forceful energy, are primary examples of ka objects. Bodily, ka represents our metabolism and body heat, and in the mental and emotional realms, it represents drive and passion. Ka can be associated with security, motivation, desire, intention, and an outgoing spirit.

Wind

風 Fū or kaze, meaning "Wind", represents things that grow, expand, and enjoy freedom of movement. Aside from air, smoke and the like, fū can in some ways be best represented by the human mind. As we grow physically, we learn and expand mentally as well, in terms of our knowledge, our experiences, and our personalities. Fū represents breathing, and the internal processes associated with respiration. Mentally and emotionally, it represents an "open-minded" attitude and carefree feeling. It can be associated with will, elusiveness, evasiveness.

Void (Aether)

空 Kū or sora, most often translated as "Void", but also meaning "sky",  "heaven" or environment, it represents those things beyond and within our everyday comprehension, particularly those things composed of pure energy before they manifest; the emptiness that the energy is made up of. Bodily, kū represents spirit, thought and creative energy. It represents the creation of phenomena. It can also be associated with the potential of power, creativity, spontaneity and inventiveness.

Kū is of particular importance as the highest of the elements. In martial arts, particularly in fictional tales where the fighting discipline is blended with magic or the occult, one often invokes the power of the Void to connect to the quintessential creative energy of the world. A warrior properly attuned to the Void can sense their surroundings and act without using the mind, and without using their "physical senses".

Representations of the godai
The most common representations today of the five elements, outside of martial arts and fictional references, are found in Buddhist architecture. 

Japanese   (from  'five',  'ring shape', and  'tower') can be seen in Zen gardens and Buddhist temples, represented as stupas. They have five divisions to represent the five elements, although the five segments can be hard to discern. Touching the ground, the bottom-most piece represents chi; the next section represents sui; ka is represented by the middle section, while fū and kū are represented by the top-most two sections, pointing towards the sky. A gorintō is composed, from bottom to top, of a cube, a sphere, a pyramid, a crescent, and a shape resembling a lotus flower. These shapes also relate to the meanings described above.

The function of the toro is different from the gorinto: they are intended to illuminate the approach to the temple like lighthouses, with a flame encased in the section representing ka, for Buddhist ceremonies taking place at night.

See also

Chinese Buddhist canon
Classical element
Feng shui
Gogyo

Pancha Bhoota
Onmyōdō
Wuxing (Chinese philosophy)

Sources

External links
 Miller, Jeff (June 1996). "5 Element Codes Part 1." Ninjutsu – Ura & Omote.
 Deon de Jongh (2003). Touhkondo: The Way of the Fighting Spirit, p. 27. iUniverse. .
 Yin Yang Five Element Medicine Inyo Gogyo setsu 

Classical elements
Five elements (Japanese philosophy)
Japanese philosophy
Philosophical theories